The Disappointment; Or, The Mother In Fashion is a 1684 comedy play by the Irish writer Thomas Southerne. It was first performed by the United Company at the Theatre Royal, Drury Lane. The prologue was written by John Dryden.

The original cast included Thomas Betterton as Alphonso, William Smith as  Lorenzo, John Wiltshire as Alberto, Anthony Leigh as Rogero, Sarah Cooke as Erminia, Susanna Percival as Juliana, Frances Maria Knight as  Angelline, Katherine Corey as  Her Supposed Mother and Elinor Leigh as Clara.

References

Bibliography
 Canfield, J. Douglas. Tricksters and Estates: On the Ideology of Restoration Comedy. University Press of Kentucky, 2014.
 Van Lennep, W. The London Stage, 1660-1800: Volume One, 1660-1700. Southern Illinois University Press, 1960.

1684 plays
West End plays
Plays by Thomas Southerne
Restoration comedy